Aesthetic atrophy is the diminished capacity to appreciate new or unfamiliar music or other sensory stimuli. It is typically accompanied by the sufferer's retreat to familiar and comfortable works.

References

Aesthetics